Donald William Snyder (December 24, 1951 – March 4, 2023) was an American politician who was a Republican member of the Pennsylvania House of Representatives.

Formative years
Snyder graduated from Parkland High School in 1969. He then earned an associate degree from Lehigh County Community College in 1971 and a B.B.A. from Penn State in 1973. 

In 1976, he earned an M.B.A. from Lehigh University, and then also earned a law degree from Villanova University School of Law in 1982 before receiving his LLM in Commerce and Taxation from the Dickinson School of Law.

Career
Snyder was sworn into the Pennsylvania House of Representatives in 1981. He served as the House Republican Caucus Chairman from 1995 to 1996 and served as Majority Whip from January 7, 1997, until his retirement prior to the 2000 elections.

Death
Snyder died at his home in Orefield, Pennsylvania, on March 4, 2023, at the age of 71.

References

External links
Pennsylvania State House biography

1951 births
2023 deaths
Dickinson School of Law alumni
Lehigh University alumni
Parkland High School (Pennsylvania) alumni
Politicians from Allentown, Pennsylvania
Republican Party members of the Pennsylvania House of Representatives
Smeal College of Business alumni
Villanova University School of Law alumni